Smoky Mountain is an adjective for things related to the Great Smoky Mountains (as in the Smoky Mountain National Park) and may refer to the following landforms:
Smoky Mountain (California), a Guadalupe Mountains summit at 
Smoky Mountain (Idaho), a Cassia County, Idaho, summit at 
Smoky Mountain (Tennessee), a Cumberland Mountains summit of 
Smoky Mountain (Utah), a summit northwest of the Glen Canyon National Recreation Area at 
Smoky Mountains (Moon)

See also
Smokey Mountain, a Manila rubbish pile
Smokey Mountain (band)